Pseudohypatopa paulilobata is a moth in the family Blastobasidae. It was described by H. Zhen and H.H. Li in 2008. It is found in China (Zhejiang).

References

Natural History Museum Lepidoptera generic names catalog

Blastobasidae
Moths described in 2008